Copeland Borough Council in Cumbria, England is elected every four years. Since the last boundary changes in 1999, 51 councillors have been elected from 25 wards.

Political control
Since the foundation of the council in 1973 political control of the council has been held by the following parties:

Leadership
Prior to 2015, political leadership was provided by the leader of the council. The leader from 2003 to 2015 was:

In 2015 the council changed to having directly-elected mayors. The mayor since 2015 has been Mike Starkie, who was elected in 2015 and 2019 as an independent, but subsequently joined the Conservatives in June 2020.

Council elections
1973 Copeland Borough Council election
1976 Copeland Borough Council election
1979 Copeland Borough Council election (New ward boundaries)
1983 Copeland Borough Council election
1987 Copeland Borough Council election
1991 Copeland Borough Council election
1995 Copeland Borough Council election
1999 Copeland Borough Council election (New ward boundaries)
2003 Copeland Borough Council election
2007 Copeland Borough Council election
2011 Copeland Borough Council election
2015 Copeland Borough Council election
2019 Copeland Borough Council election

Borough result maps

By-election results

1995-1999

1999-2003

2003-2007

2007-2011

2011-2015

2015-2019

2019-2023

References

By-election results

External links
 Copeland Council

 
Council elections in Cumbria
Borough of Copeland
District council elections in England